Rabbi Yisrael Meir Uri Maklev (born 10 January 1957) is an Israeli politician. He served as Deputy Minister of Transportation and Road Safety and was previously a member of the Knesset for the Haredi party Degel HaTorah, which together with Agudat Yisrael forms the United Torah Judaism list.

Biography
Maklev, a graduate of both Kol HaTorah Yeshiva and Ponivezh Yeshiva, served as a member of Jerusalem City Council and as Deputy Mayor of Jerusalem from 1993 to 2008. In this position, he was a member of the municipality's executive, holding the education portfolio and sitting on the finance and education committees. He was also a member of the local planning and construction committee, and the municipality's representative to Jerusalem's Sewage and Water Corporation.

On 31 July 2008, Maklev entered the Knesset on the basis of an internal party rotation agreement. Upon his entry, Degel HaTorah had three seats for the first time in its history. He retained his seat in the 2009 elections, after being placed fourth on the alliance's list. He was attacked in Mea Shearim on 24 June 2010 as he emerged from a synagogue. He and Moshe Gafni had paid a visit to the Slonim rabbi, who lives in that neighborhood, and then entered a synagogue to pray. When they emerged, they were set upon by young extremists from Neturei Karta who spat at them and assaulted them with stones, blows, and a chair.

He was re-elected in 2013, 2015, April 2019, 2019, and 2020. In May 2020, he was appointed Deputy Minister of Transportation and Road Safety. He subsequently resigned from the Knesset under the Norwegian Law, and was replaced by Eliyahu Baruchi.

He is married, with five children, and lives in Jerusalem.

References

External links

1957 births
Living people
Degel HaTorah politicians
Deputy Mayors of Jerusalem
Deputy ministers of Israel
Deputy Speakers of the Knesset
Haredi rabbis in Israel
Jewish Israeli politicians
Members of the 17th Knesset (2006–2009)
Members of the 18th Knesset (2009–2013)
Members of the 19th Knesset (2013–2015)
Members of the 20th Knesset (2015–2019)
Members of the 21st Knesset (2019)
Members of the 22nd Knesset (2019–2020)
Members of the 23rd Knesset (2020–2021)
Members of the 24th Knesset (2021–2022)
Members of the 25th Knesset (2022–)
People from Bnei Brak
Rabbinic members of the Knesset
United Torah Judaism politicians